Rybnica  is a village in the administrative district of Gmina Klimontów, within Sandomierz County, Świętokrzyskie Voivodeship, in south-central Poland.

The village has a population of 90.

During the January Uprising, on October 20, 1863, it was the site of the Battle of Rybnica, in which Polish insurgents commanded by Dionizy Czachowski defeated Russian troops.

References

Villages in Sandomierz County